Condica videns, the white-dotted groundling moth, is a moth of the family Noctuidae. It is found in North America, where it has been recorded from Texas to Florida, north to Quebec and west to Alberta.

The wingspan is about 28 mm. The forewings are yellowish to reddish-brown with a dark brownish to blackish shade in the middle of the wing and a black line from the base through the reniform spot, which is indicated by a white dot. There are dark grey to black lines on the subterminal area and the terminal line is marked by white dots. Adults are on wing from April to September in at least two generations per year.

Larvae feed on the blooms of various composite flowers, including Solidago and Aster species.

References

Moths described in 1852
Condicinae